Palmaris muscle may refer to:

 Palmaris brevis muscle
 Palmaris longus muscle
 Palmaris profundus muscle

See also
 Palmaris (butterfly), a butterfly genus in the subtribe Pronophilina